The Fort Lauderdale Braves was a minor league baseball team in Fort Lauderdale, Florida from 1947 until 1953 that played its home games at Westside Ballpark at the north fork of the New River at Broward Boulevard. The team was a member of the Florida International League and were affiliated with the Boston Braves in 1947. 

The team split its games in 1952 in Key West as the Key West Conchs. During their final season, the team was renamed the Fort Lauderdale Lions.

Notable alumni
 Dick Donovan (1947) 5 x MLB All-Star; 1961 AL ERA Title

References
Fort Lauderdale Braves

Baseball teams established in 1947
Baseball teams disestablished in 1953
Defunct baseball teams in Florida
Defunct minor league baseball teams
Boston Braves minor league affiliates
1947 establishments in Florida
1953 disestablishments in Florida
Sports in Fort Lauderdale, Florida